"Tu Príncipe" is a song by Daddy Yankee from his album Barrio Fino.  featuring Zion & Lennox.

Charts

References

2006 songs
Daddy Yankee songs
Zion & Lennox songs
Spanish-language songs
Songs written by Daddy Yankee
Song recordings produced by Luny Tunes
2004 songs